Deir Siriane     is a village the  Marjeyoun District in Southern Lebanon.

Name
According to E. H. Palmer, the name Deir es Suriân means  "the convent of the Syrian".

History
In 1596, it was named as a village,  Dayr Siryan, in the Ottoman nahiya (subdistrict) of  Tibnin  under the liwa' (district) of Safad, with a population of  10  households and 1 bachelor, all Muslim. The villagers paid a  fixed tax-rate of 25 % on  agricultural products, such as wheat, barley, olive trees,  goats, beehives, in addition to "occasional revenues" and a press for olive oil or grape syrup; a total of 2,952 akçe.

In the early 1860s, Ernest Renan found here remains of old buildings and a cistern. In 1875, Victor Guérin found that the village had Metawileh inhabitants, and noted: "Cisterns and tanks partly cut in the rock and partly built. Hewn stones show that here was an ancient village or edifice."

In 1881, the PEF's Survey of Western Palestine (SWP)  described it as  "a village, built of stone, containing about 200 Metawileh, situated on the plain and surrounded by small gardens and arable land. Water from wells and a spring."

References

Bibliography

External links
  Deir Siriane, Localiban
Survey of Western Palestine, Map 2:   IAA, Wikimedia commons

Populated places in Marjeyoun District
Shia Muslim communities in Lebanon